Radnor House Sevenoaks School (formerly Combe Bank School) is a coeducational private day school located in Sundridge (near Sevenoaks) in the English county of Kent.

In 2016, The Radnor House Group officially took over Combe Bank School (a girls only independent school). The school was re-launched on 1 September 2016 as Radnor House Sevenoaks, a co-educational independent school for boys and girls aged 2–18. It is a member of the ISA and IAPS.

History

The five eras of the Combe Bank estate:
18th century: Campbell  family – Baron Sundridge’s seat,
19th century: Cardinal Manning and William Spottiswoode,
The Mond era,
The Order, and school to date,
World Wars: evacuation and recuperation.

The Combe Bank estate has been through a number of ownerships, as with many an estate. The grade 1 listed  Palladian House by Roger Morris, was built for Col John Campbell and modelled on the Argyll family seat of Inverary. It became in the early 19th century the boyhood home of Henry, later Cardinal, Manning, and later of William Spottiswoode, the King’s printer. 1907 saw the estate purchased by Ludwig Mond of the British chemical engineering giant ICI. The difficult economic climate of the 1920s saw the 518 acres of the estate sold in seventeen lots, sold in three tranches. For the founding of a convent and school, the House and grounds were purchased by the Society of the Holy Child Jesus. During the World Wars Combe Bank provided convalescence for the wounded, latterly under the British Red Cross and St John of Jerusalem; the school having evacuated first to Torquay and latterly to Coughton Court in Warwickshire. Combe Bank a convent boarding and day school from the 1920s was re-founded in 1973 as an independent girls’ day school.

Science, religion and learning are recurring themes in the history of Combe Bank. As a Fellow of the Royal Society William Spottiswoode a mathematician, undertook research of light, publishing in 1874, “The Polarisation of light”, and “Lecture on Electrical discharge” in 1881. Spottiswoode later becoming President of the Royal Society. Among those who visited Combe Bank at this time were literary figures such as Oscar Wilde and Matthew Arnold; and scientists T H Huxley, Charles Darwin and Michael Faraday.

Each of the eras in the estate’s history has seen extension and remodelling of the property.  Significant among which must rank the stable block of 1809, becoming part used in the 1900s as garaging for the motor vehicles of the Monds as keen ‘automobilists’, and later as laboratories for Robert Mond in his work on carbonyls.  Later as St Anthony’s, the stables provided accommodation for the Order.  In the House, the work by Walter Crane of the Arts and Crafts movement  in ‘The Saloon’ in the 1880s can be seen, and that of Walter Cave, President of the Royal Society of British Architects effecting a design by Adam for the ‘Adam Room’ ceiling again in the 1900s. A major extension to the north added ‘The Long Gallery’ giving the Mond family a ballroom and space for amateur theatricals. Wartime needs saw the creation of 9 wards providing 73 recuperation beds. The Order’s major extension was completed in 1931 and provided a dining room, hall, and classrooms above.  The Order made the Long Gallery their chapel, a space which today serves as the Sixth Form Common Room. Subsequent developments have included a gym, swimming pool, sports hall, STEM Centre and Performing Arts theatre.

Curriculum
The 2015 ISI report scored the school as ‘Excellent’ (highest grading, equivalent to the Ofsted ‘Outstanding’) for the areas linked to their teaching and learning, achievement, pastoral care and personal development. .

The curriculum in the Prep is rich, engaging and hugely varied with pupils studying ICT, Performing/Visual Arts and Outdoor Adventurous Education alongside the more traditional subjects such as English, Maths, Geography, History and Science.

In the Senior School pupils study a wide-ranging curriculum which places equal value on traditional subjects whilst also preparing pupils to flourish in a rapidly evolving world.

Activities
Radnor House Sevenoaks offers an extremely varied co-curricular programme including Forest School, Sports, Performing Arts, Dance, Music, Art & Design, Young Enterprise, Duke of Edinburgh Award, Science, Debating, Literature. It has an enriching scholarship programme with academic, sport, art, music, drama and all-rounder scholarships available. Radnor House Sevenoaks also aims to introduce children to the benefits of charitable giving from an early age. The school supports local and national charities and also works with Project Le Monde to support the Radnor House School in Uganda.

References

External links
 School Website
 ISI Inspection Report

Private schools in Kent
Member schools of the Independent Schools Association (UK)
Grade I listed buildings in Kent
Buildings and structures in Sevenoaks District